Bathyphysa conifera, sometimes called the flying spaghetti monster, is a bathypelagic species of siphonophore in the family Rhizophysidae.

Name

Bathyphysa conifera was nicknamed the Flying Spaghetti Monster, for the satirical deity of the Internet, by the oil workers who first saw it. The specific epithet conifera, meaning 'cone-bearing', is due to the shape of the cluster of reproductive structures called gonophores. In Japanese it is called  /  /  , "jewel leek". In Chinese, the nickname "Flying Spaghetti Monster" can be translated as   "flying noodles monster".

Distribution
Bathyphysa conifera has been found in the Northeast and Northwest Atlantic Ocean, off the coast of Gabon and as far south as Angola, and in Monterey Bay in the Pacific Ocean.

Description

Although B. conifera may appear to be an individual organism, each specimen is in fact a colonial organism composed of medusoid and polypoid zooids that are morphologically and functionally specialized. Zooids are multicellular units that develop from a single fertilized egg and combine to create functional colonies able to: reproduce, digest, float, and maintain body positioning.

It has a cystonect body plan, meaning it has a pneumatophore, or float, and siphosome, or line of polyps, but no nectosome, or propulsion medusae.  Without that propulsion, B. conifera moves through contracting and relaxing the body stem.  It differs from members of the genus Rhizophysa by the presence of ptera, or side 'wings', on the young gastrozooids, or feeding polyps.  It is distinct from other members of the genus Bathyphysa as its tentacles do not have any side branches, or tentilla.  Tentilla are thought to be ancestral to siphonophores, and B. conifera likely lost the trait as did Apolemia.  The tentacles have stinging cells called nematocysts that are haploneme, or uniform in thickness, and have a single size of isorhiza, or anchoring nematocysts.

The entire animal, including tentacles, is several meters long.  The feeding polyps are pink when young, before developing tentacles.  A mature feeding polyp is yellow with a single tentacle.

Colonies are unisexual, and reproduce by incomplete asexual reproduction.  Not much more is known about B. conifera reproduction.  Early development of cystonects is not known either.  Siphonophores generally start life as a single-celled zygote, which divided and grows into a single polyp called a protozooid.  The protozooid then divides by budding into all the zooids of the colony.  The zooids are homologous to individual animals, but are connected physiologically to each other.

Ecology
Like many siphonophores, it is carnivorous.  The typical siphonophore diet consists of a variety of copepods, small crustaceans, and small fish.  B. conifera has been observed eating a lanternfish.

A species of manefish in the genus Caristius associates apparently mutualistically with B. conifera, using it for shelter, stealing meals, and perhaps nibbling on its host as well, yet protecting it from amphipod parasites like Themisto.

References

External links
 
 Video footage
 Footage from Angolan waters
 Series of Sherman's Lagoon comic strips on the creature
 Caristius specimen found with a B. conifera

Rhizophysidae
Cnidarians of the Atlantic Ocean
Cnidarians of the Pacific Ocean
Animals described in 1878